Rachael Low (6 July 1923 – 14 December 2014) was a British film historian, best known as the author of the seven-volume The History of the British Film.

The daughter of the cartoonist Sir David Low, she gained her BSc in sociology and economics in 1944 from the London School of Economics, and her doctorate from the University of London in 1949. She published, in seven volumes between 1948 and 1985, The History of the British Film; this examines, in exacting detail, film production in Britain from its origins in 1896 until 1939. She was awarded a Research Fellowship by Lucy Cavendish College, Cambridge, to facilitate her work on the later volumes of the series.

Film critic Matthew Sweet has criticised Low's "tyrannous influence" on the writings of subsequent film historians.

Legacy
The annual Rachael Low Lecture was established in 2007 in her honour, as part of the British Silent Film Festival. In December 2018, an event was held at the British Film Institute Library to assess her legacy and mark her contribution to the history of early British film.

Principal works
Originally published by George Allen & Unwin, Low's history is now published by Routledge.
The History of the British Film 1896–1906 (with Roger Manvell), Allen & Unwin, 1948
The History of the British Film 1906–1914, Allen & Unwin, 1948
The History of the British Film 1914–1918, Allen & Unwin, 1948
The History of the British Film 1918–1929, Allen & Unwin, 1950
The History of the British Film 1929–1939: Films of Comment and Persuasion of the 1930s, Allen & Unwin, 1979
The History of the British Film 1929–1939: Documentary and Educational films of the 1930s, Allen & Unwin, 1979
The History of the British Film: Film Making in 1930s Britain, Allen & Unwin, 1985

References

1923 births
Fellows of Lucy Cavendish College, Cambridge
British film historians
2014 deaths
Alumni of the London School of Economics
British women historians